Lee Hudson Teslik is a corporate strategy executive at Google.  He was previously a speechwriter for Queen Rania of Jordan, and has also worked at the Council on Foreign Relations and as a consultant at McKinsey & Company. His writings have been published in The New York Times, Washington Post, Slate, Newsweek, and Time, and he has written for The Economist as a guest writer. He has reported from several countries including Iraq, Kosovo, and China. He holds a bachelor's degree from Harvard University and an MBA from INSEAD.

Awards and honors
"Crisis Guide: Global Economy"—an interactive online examination of the financial crisis which Teslik wrote for the Council on Foreign Relations—won a 2009 Emmy Award in the category "New Approaches to Business and Financial Reporting."

References

External links
Talking Point: The Blog at LeeHudsonTeslik.com
LeeHudsonTeslik.com
Roubini Global Economics

American speechwriters
The Harvard Lampoon alumni
Living people
INSEAD alumni
Year of birth missing (living people)